The Wormke is a river of Saxony-Anhalt, Germany, in the Harz Mountains.

Course 
After turning towards the southeast, it crosses the Glashüttenweg footpath on the Harzer Hexenstieg trail, where a weir diverts almost all its water into the Wormsgraben ditch. Next the Wormke is crossed by the tracks of the Brocken Railway, the Hagenstraße (L 100) road, on an embankment, and the tracks of the Harz Railway. Near  (a part of Elend) the river finally discharges into the Kalte Bode.

See also 
List of rivers of Saxony-Anhalt

Rivers of the Harz
Rivers of Saxony-Anhalt
Rivers of Germany